Candler is an unincorporated community in Buncombe County, North Carolina, United States.  It lies on North Carolina Highway 151 and U.S. Routes 19, 23, and 74 Business, at an elevation of 2,122.7 feet (647 m).  The ZIP code of Candler is 28715. The community is part of the Asheville Metropolitan Statistical Area. The population of Candler is about 26,000.

This mountain community nestles in Hominy Valley, approximately halfway between Asheville (to the east) and Canton (to the west) via Interstate 40 (about 20 minutes either way). Mount Pisgah, with access to the Blue Ridge Parkway, stands to the south,  and Asheville to the east.

Most of Candler lies within the district of Enka High School, a public secondary school.

References

Unincorporated communities in North Carolina
Unincorporated communities in Buncombe County, North Carolina
Asheville metropolitan area